Charina is a genus of nonvenomous boas, commonly known as rubber boas, found in North America. Two species are currently recognized.

Distribution and habitat
Found in North America from western Canada south through the western United States into northwestern Mexico.

Species

) Not including the nominate subspecies.
T) Type species.

Taxonomy
Sources vary on how many species the genus contains. Some consider the rubber boa, C. bottae, to be the sole member of the genus. In addition, some experts consider the southern rubber boa, C. umbratica to be a subspecies of C. bottae. Although the Calabar python, Calabaria reinhardtii has been included in Charina, recent phylogenetic analyses based on DNA have shown that it does not belong to this genus.

References

Further reading

Gray JE (1849). Catalogue of the Specimens of Snakes in the Collection of the British Museum. London: Trustees of the British Museum. (Edward Newman, printer). xv + 125 pp. (Charina, p. 113).
Kluge AG (1993). "Calabaria and the phylogeny of erycine snakes". Zoological Journal of the Linnean Society 107: 293–351.  PDF at University of Michigan Library. Accessed 20 July 2008.

External links

 
 
 
 Charina at Life is Short, but Snakes are Long

 
Snakes of North America
Snake genera
Taxa named by John Edward Gray